José Esteban Muñoz (August 9, 1967 – December 3, 2013) was a Cuban American academic in the fields of performance studies, visual culture, queer theory, cultural studies, and critical theory.  His first book, Disidentifications: Queers of Color and the Performance of Politics (1999) examines the performance, activism, and survival of queer people of color through the optics of performance studies. His second book, Cruising Utopia: the Then and There of Queer Futurity, was published by NYU Press in 2009. Muñoz was Professor in, and former Chair of, the Department of Performance Studies at New York University's Tisch School of the Arts. Muñoz was the recipient of the Duke Endowment Fellowship (1989) and the Penn State University Fellowship (1997). He was also affiliated with the Modern Language Association, American Studies Association, and the College Art Association.

Biography
Muñoz was born in Havana, Cuba in 1967, shortly before relocating with his parents to the Cuban exile enclave of Hialeah, Florida, the same year. He received his undergraduate education at Sarah Lawrence College in 1989 with a B.A. in Comparative Literature. In 1994, he completed his doctorate from the Graduate Program in Literature at Duke University, where he studied under the tutelage of queer theorist Eve Kosofsky Sedgwick. He wrote about artists, performers, and cultural figures including Vaginal Davis, Nao Bustamante, Carmelita Tropicana, Isaac Julien, Jorge Ignacio Cortiñas, Kevin Aviance, James Schuyler, Richard Fung, Basquiat, Pedro Zamora, and Andy Warhol. His work is indebted to the work of Chicana feminists: Gloria Anzaldúa, Cherríe Moraga, Chela Sandoval, and Norma Alarcón, members of the Frankfurt School of critical thinkers such as Ernst Bloch, Theodor Adorno, and Walter Benjamin, and the philosophy of Martin Heidegger.

Muñoz died in New York City in December 2013. He was working on what would have been his third book, The Sense of Brown: Ethnicity, Affect and Performance, to be published by Duke University Press. In addition to his two single authored books, Muñoz co-edited the books Pop Out: Queer Warhol (1996) with Jennifer Doyle and Jonathan Flatley and Everynight Life: Culture and Dance in Latin/o America (1997) with Celeste Fraser Delgado. Along with Ann Pellegrini, José Muñoz was the founding series editor for NYU Press's influential Sexual Cultures book series which premiered in 1998. Grounded in women of color feminism, the series specializes in titles "that offer alternative mappings of queer life in which questions of race, class, gender, temporality, religion, and region are as central as sexuality" and was foundational to the establishment of queer of color critique. Muñoz also worked on the initial Crossing Borders Conference in 1996, which focused on Latin America and Latino queer sexualities. He was a Board Member of CUNY's CLAGS: The Center for LGBTQ Studies and editor of the Journal Social Text and Women and Performance: A Journal of Feminist Theory. Shortly after his death, CLAGS instituted an award in his honor, given to LGBTQ activists who integrate Queer Studies into their work. The inaugural recipient of the award was Janet Mock in 2015. In the Spring of 2016, the Department of Performance Studies at New York University inaugurated the distinguished José Esteban Muñoz Memorial Lecture; speakers have included Fred Moten, José Quiroga, and Judith Butler.

Research and areas of interest 
Muñoz challenges and questions contemporary mainstream gay and lesbian politics. He argues that present gay and lesbian politics, whose political goal is gay rights, same-sex marriage, and gays in the military, are trapped within the limiting normative time and present. Following Ernst Bloch's The Principle of Hope, Muñoz is interested in the socially symbolic dimension of certain aesthetic processes that promote political idealism. Muñoz re-articulates queerness as something "not yet here." Queerness "is that thing that lets us feel that this world is not enough." Muñoz reconceptualizes queerness from identity politics and brings it into the field of aesthetics. For Muñoz, queer aesthetics, such as the visual artwork of Vaginal Davis, offers a blueprint to map future social relations. Queerness in Muñoz's conceptualization, is a rejection of "straight time", the "here and now" and an insistence of the "then and there." Muñoz proposes the concept of "disidentificatory performances," as acts of transgression and creation, by which racial and sexual minorities, or minoritarian subjects articulate the truth about cultural hegemony. Muñoz critiques Lee Edelman's book "No Future" and the concept of queer death drive that results in Muñoz theorization of queer futurity or queer sociality. Queer futurity thus "illuminates a landscape of possibility for minoritarian subjects through the aesthetic-strategies for surviving and imagining utopian modes of being in the world."

Ephemera as evidence 
Muñoz first introduced his concept of ephemera as evidence in the 1996 issue of Women & Performance: A Journal of Feminist Theory. The idea that performance is ephemeral is essential to the field of performance studies. In this essay, Muñoz claims that ephemera does not disappear. Ephemera in the Muñozian sense, is a modality of "anti-rigor" and "anti-evidence" that reformulates understandings of materiality. Building on Raymond Williams' concept of "structures of feeling", Muñoz claims that the ephemeral, "traces, glimmers, residues, and specks of things," is distinctly material, though not always solid. Framing the performative as both an intellectual and discursive event, he begins by defining queerness as a possibility, a modality, of the social and the relational, a sense of self-knowing. He argues that queerness is passed on surreptitiously due to the fact that the trace of queerness often leaves the queer subject vulnerable for attack. Muñoz's definition of ephemera is influenced by Paul Gilroy's The Black Atlantic "as part of the exchange of ephemera that connects and makes concert a community." As a result, Muñoz states, queerness has not been able to exist as "visible evidence" rather it has had to exist in fleeting moments. Thus, queer performances stand as evidence of queer possibilities and queer worldmaking. Muñoz understands Marlon Riggs' documentary films Tongues Untied and Black Is, Black Ain't as examples of an ephemeral witnessing of Black queer identity. In 2013,  Muñoz was a collaborator on the exhibit, An Unhappy Archive at Les Complices in Zurich. The goal of the exhibit was to question the normative definition of happiness through the use of texts, posters, books, and drawings. The title of the project is a reference to Sara Ahmed's concept of the "unhappy archive." According to Ahmed, the unhappy archive is a collective project rooted in feminist-queer and anti-racist politics. Other collaborators include Ann Cvetkovich, Karin Michalski, Sabian Baumann, Eve Kosofsky Sedgwick. Muñoz departs from Peggy Phelan's argument that the ontology of performance lies in its disappearance. Muñoz parts from this view as it is confined to a narrow view of time. He suggests live performance exists ephemerally then without completely disappearing after it vanishes.

Disidentification 
Muñoz's theory of disidentification builds on Michel Pêcheux's understanding of disidentification and subject formation by examining how minoritarian subjects whose identities render them a minority (e.g. queer people of color), negotiate identity in a majoritarian world that punishes and attempts to erase the existence of those who do not fit the normative subject (i.e. heterosexual, cisgender, white, middle class, male). Muñoz notes how queer people of color, as a result of the effects of colonialism, have been placed outside dominant racial and sexual ideology, namely white normativity and heteronormativity. In his own words, "disidentification is about managing and negotiating historical trauma and systemic violence." The disidentificatory subject does not assimilate (identify) nor reject (counter identify) dominant ideology. Rather, the disidentificatory subject employs a third strategy, and, "tactically and simultaneously works on, with, and against, a cultural form." Aside from being a process of identification, disidentification is also a survival strategy. Through disidentification, the disidentifying subject is able to rework the cultural codes of the mainstream to read themselves into the mainstream, a simultaneous insertion and subversion. By the mode of disidentification, queer subjects are directed towards the future. Through the use of shame and "misrecognition through failed interpellation, queer collectivity neither assimilates nor strictly opposes the dominant regime," but works on strategies that result in queer counterpublics.

His theory of disidentification is foundational to understandings of queer of color performance art and has proved indispensable across a wide variety of disciplines. Muñoz's argument is in conversation with Stefan Brecht's theory of "queer theater." Brecht argues that queer theater inevitably turns into humor and passive repetition, ultimately, falling apart. Muñoz is wary of Brecht's theory, as it doesn't seem to consider the work of artists of color and also ignores the use of humor as a didactic and political project. Muñoz argues that the work of queer artists of color is political and will remain political as long as the logic of dominant ideology exists.

Counterpublics 
In Disidentifications, drawing from Nancy Fraser's notion of "counterpublics," which she states "contest the exclusionary norms of the 'official' bourgeois public sphere, elaborating alternative styles of political behavior and alternative forms of speech," Muñoz defines his own invocation of counterpublics as "communities and relational chains of resistance that contest the dominant public sphere." Counterpublics have the capacity of world-making through a series of cultural performances that disidentify with the normative scripts of whiteness, heternormativity, and misogyny. Counterpublics disrupt social scripts and create through their work an opening of possibility for other visions of the world that map different, utopian social relations. Muñoz suggests that such work is vital for queer people of color subjects survival and possibilities for another world. At the center of counterpublic performances is the idea of educated hope, "which is both critical affect and methodology." Jack Halberstam in the book In a Queer Time & Place, discusses the role of Drag king culture as a form of counterpublics that validate and produce "minoritarian public spheres" at the same time they challenge white heteronormativity. Examples of counterpublics includes visual performances like , Vaginal Davis, and Cuban activist and The Real World: San Francisco cast-member, Pedro Zamora.

Queer futurity and optimism 
Queer futurity is a literary and queer cultural theory that combines elements of utopianism, historicism, speech act theory, and political idealism in order to critique the present and current dilemmas faced by queer people of color, but also to revise, interrogate, and re-examine the death drive in queer theory. Queer futurity or "queer sociability" addresses themes and concerns of minoritarian subjects through a performance and aesthetics lens, encompassing a range of media and artists with a shared interest in envisioning queer futures that stem from minoritarian subject experiences. The study of queer sociability has expanded beyond the fields of Performance Studies, Queer Theory, and Gender and Women's Studies and has been used by various scholars to address issues of Black Diaspora Studies, Caribbean Studies, and musicology, and has also led to the field of queer of color critique.

In Cruising Utopia, José Muñoz develops a critical methodology of hope to question the present and open up the future. He draws on Ernst Bloch's Marxist inspired analysis of hope, temporality, and utopia, and looks at "inspirational moments from the past in order to (re)imagine the future." In the book, Muñoz revisits a series of queer art works from the past to envision the political potentiality within them. He draws on the queer work of Frank O'Hara, Andy Warhol, Fred Herko, LeRoi Jones, Ray Johnson, Jill Johnston, Jack Smith, James Schulyer, Elizabeth Bishop and Samuel Delany's and Eileen Myles queer memoirs of the 60s and 70s. Muñoz develops a hermeneutics of "trace and residue to read the mattering of these works, their influence and world-making capacity." This world-making capacity allows for a queer futurity. Muñoz develops an argument for about queerness as horizon, hope, and futurity. According to Fred Moten, "Jose's queerness is a utopian project whose temporal dimensionality is manifest not only as projection into the future but also as projection of a certain futurity into and onto the present and the past."

Chusma 
Muñoz theorizes chusmeria or chusma, as a form of behavior that is in excess of normative comportment. Chusmeria is "a form of behavior that refuses bourgeois comportment and suggests Latinos should not be too black, too poor, or too sexual, among other characteristics that exceed normativity." Queer theorist Deborah Vargas uses chusmeria to inform her theory of lo sucio, "the dirty, nasty, and filthy" of society. In the Muñozian sense, "lo sucio" persistently lingers as the "yet to be".

Sense of feeling brown 
Muñoz began to theorize on brown affect in his piece "Feeling Brown: Ethnicity and Affect" in Ricardo Bracho's The Sweetest Hangover (and Other STDs). In this article, Muñoz wanted to focus on ethnicity, affect, and performance in order to question the U.S. national affect and highlight the affective struggles that keep minoritarian subjects from accessing normative identity politics. Muñoz's undertaking was to move beyond notions of ethnicity as "what people are" and instead understand it as a performative "what people do." Muñoz describes how race and ethnicity are to be understood as "affective" differences. Affective differences are the "ways in which different historically coherent groups 'feel' differently and navigate the material world on a different emotional register." In the piece "Feeling Brown", Muñoz discussed the notion of racial performativity as a form of political doing based on the recognition of the effects of race. Thus, "feeling brown" is a modality of recognizing the affective particularities coded to specific historical subjects, like the term Latina. He emphasized that Brown feelings "are not individualized affective particularity" but rather is a collective mapping of self and others. The turn from identity to affect resulted in Muñoz's conceptualization of the "Brown Commons" as the key point in which race is experienced as a feeling, as an affective specificity. Licia Fiol-Matta describes Jose's "Cubanity" as a "disidentity, a feeling brown, part of a brown undercommons and as an artistic manifestation of the sense of brown." With Latinidad as an affective difference, "José gave us a road map or toolkit to point us in the direction of the gap, wound, or hole of displacement as a necessary condition for interpretation to take place."

Influence and impact 
After his death, a special issue of the journal Boundary 2, themed "The Beauty of José Esteban Muñoz", was published. The journal featured pieces from various scholars influenced by Muñoz including Juana María Rodríguez, Fred Moten, Daphne Brooks, Elizabeth Freeman, Jack Halberstam, and Ann Cvetkovich. The issue covered themes related to Muñoz's contribution to various academic fields such as queer of color critique, affect studies, and the new ways to conceptualized concepts such as Latina/o identity, queer ephemera, and temporality. After Muñoz's death, various art, literary, and academic institutions, artists, and periodicals,  commemorated his legacy and contributions through a series of online and journal based obituaries and memorial lectures and annual events. In the special edition of Boundary 2, Ann Cvetkovich credits Muñoz for the explosion and morphing of the field of affect theory as a result of Jose's work. Deborah Paredez describes Muñoz as key to the practice of a critical and ethical attentiveness to a wide range of performances by Latina/o artists and for helping scholars listen to the melody of what is like to feel brown.

In 2014, Muñoz's concept of ephemera as evidence was the theme for a Visual AIDS exhibit, curated by Joshua Lubin-Levy and Ricardo Montez. The exhibit took its name from Muñoz's 1996 essay, Ephemera as Evidence: Introductory Notes to Queer Acts. Featuring visual art, performance art, and pedagogical projects, Ephemera as Evidence explores how the HIV/AIDS crisis forged new relationships of temporality. The exhibit, which ran from June 5 to June 24 at La Mama Galleria, featured works from Nao Bustamante, Carmelita Tropicana, Benjamin Fredrickson, and more.

Muñoz's disidentification theory has also influenced other thinkers in the field. In Crip Theory: Cultural Signs of Queerness and Disability, Robert McRuer, draws on Muñoz's theory of disidentification to articulate and imagine "collective disidentifications" made possible when putting queer and crip theory in conversation. Diana Taylor, Ann Cvetkovich, Roderick Ferguson, and Jack Halberstam have cited and applied Muñoz to their own work. Muñoz was also influential to the field of Queer of Color Critique. In the book Aberrations in Black, Roderick Ferguson employs Muñoz's disidentification theory to reveal how the discourses of sexuality are used to articulate theories of racial difference in the field of sociology. Moreover, disidentification theory has been used by an array of scholars to apply a queer of color critique to various themes such as identity politics, temporality, homonationalism, and diaspora and native studies.

Begun in 1989, the annual event is meant to commemorate the AIDS crisis and give artists a platform to display work that reflects and responds to the history of HIV/AIDS. Titled, "Counterpublicity", the video performance is based on Muñoz's essay on Pedro Zamora. In the embodied performance, the three artists recreate scenes from The Real World: San Francisco in an exaggerated manner, critically examining the politics of reality television. Lyrics for the piece were adapted from Muñoz's theory of counterpublic spheres. In a panel, My Barbarian said, "the video is a remembrance within a remembrance: to Pedro Zamora and to José Esteban Muñoz." The video premiered at Outfest in Los Angeles.

Xandra Ibarra, La Chica Boom use of "spics" is influenced by Muñoz's Sense of Brown and Counterpublics. For Muñoz, spics are epithets linked to questions of affect and excess affect. Ibarra's performances of "la Virgensota Jota" and "La tortillera" are ways to re-inhabit toxic languages for the purpose of remapping the social or what Muñoz described as disidentificatory performances. Muñoz has seminal influence on many American scholars and artists, among them Robert McRuer, Roderick Ferguson, Daphne Brooks, Nadia Ellis, Juana María Rodríguez, Deborah Paredez, and Ann Cvetkovich.

Publications

Books 

 Disidentifications: Queers of Color and the Performance of Politics (1999). Minneapolis: University of Minnesota Press. .
 Cruising Utopia: The Then and There of Queer Futurity (2009). New York: NYU Press. . Translated to Spanish (Utopía queer, Caja Negra, 2020) and French (Cruiser l'utopie, Les Presses du Réel, 2021).
 The Sense of Brown (2020). Durham, NC: Duke University Press. .

Edited books 
 With Celeste Fraser Delgado. Everynight Life: Culture and Dance in Latin/o America. Durham: Duke University Press, 1997.
 With Jennifer Doyle and Jonathan Flatley. Pop Out: Queer Warhol. Durham: Duke University Press, 1996.

Book chapters 
 "The Future in the Present: Sexual Avant-Gardes and the Performance of Utopia." The Future of American Studies. Eds. Donald Pease and Robyn Weigman. Durham and London: Duke University Press, 2002.
 "Gesture, Ephemera and Queer Feeling: Approaching Kevin Aviance." in _Dancing Desires: Choreographing Sexuality On and Off the Stage_ Ed. Jane Desmond. (Madison: University of Wisconsin Press, 2001.
 "The Autoethnographic Performance: Reading Richard Fung's Queer Hybridity." Performing Hybridity. Eds. Jennifer Natalya Fink and May Joseph. Minneapolis: University of Minnesota Press, 1999.
 "Latino Theatre and Queer Theory." Queer Theatre. Ed. Alisa Solomon. New York: New York University Press, 1999.
 "Luis Alfar's Memory Theatre." Corpus Delecti. Ed. Coco Fusco. New York and London: Routledge, 1999.
 "Pedro Zamora's Real World of Counterpublicity: Performing an Ethics of the Self." Living Color: Race and Television. Ed. Sasha Torres. Durham and London: Duke University Press, 1998.
 "Rough Boy Trade: Queer Desire/Straight Identity in the Photography of Larry Clark." The Passionate Camera. Ed. Deborah Bright. New York: Routledge, 1998.
 "Photographies of Mourning: Ambivalence and Melancholia in Mapplethorpe (Edited by Van Der Zee) and Looking for Langston." Race and the Subject(s) of Masculinity. Eds. Harry Uebel and Michael Stecopoulos. Durham and London: Duke University Press, 1997.
 "Famous and Dandy Like B. 'n' Andy: Race, Pop, and Basquiat." Pop Out: Queer Warhol. Eds. Jennifer Doyle, Jonathan Flatley and José Esteban Muñoz. Durham and London: Duke University Press, 1996.
 "Flaming Latinas: Ela Troyano's Carmelita Tropicana: Your Kunst Is Your Waffen." The Ethnic Eye: Latino Media. Eds. Ana M. L—pez and Chon A. Noriega. Minneapolis: University of Minnesota Press, 1996.
 "Ghosts of Public Sex: Utopian Longings, Queer Memories." Policing Public Sex: Queer Politics and the Future of AIDS Activism. Ed. Dangerous Bedfellows. Boston: South End Press, 1996.

Selected journal articles 
 "The Queer Social Text," Social Text 100 Vol 27, No. 3 (Fall 2009): 215–218.
 "From Surface to Depth, between Psychoanalysis and Affect," Women and Performance: A Journal of Feminist Theory. Vol. 19, No 2 (July 2009): 123–129.
 "Hope and Hopelessness: A Dialogue," with Lisa Duggan, Women and Performance: A Journal of Feminist Theory. Vol. 19, No 2 (July 2009): 275–283.
 "The Vulnerability Artist: Nao Bustamate and the Sad Beauty of Reparation," Women and Performance: A Journal of Feminist Theory, Vol. 16, No. 2, (July 2006): 191–200.
 "Feeling Brown, Feeling Down: Latina Affect, the Performativity of Race, and the Depressive Position," Signs: Journal of Women in Culture and Society, Vol. 31, No 3 (2006): 675–688.
 "What's Queer about Queer Studies Now," with David. L. Eng and Judith Halberstam in Social Text: What's Queer about Queer Studies Now? ed. with David L. Eng and Judith Halberstam, Vol. 23, Nos. 84-86 (Fall/Winter 2005): 1-18.
 "My Own Private Latin America: The Politics and Poetics of Trade," (with John Emil Vincent), Dispositio/n 50 (Spring 1998 [2000]), 19–36.
 "Ephemera as Evidence: Introductory Notes to Queer Acts," Queer Acts: Women and Performance, A Journal of Feminist Theory, eds. José E. Muñoz and Amanda Barrett, Vol. 8, No. 2 (1996): 5-18.

References

External links
 2013 Feminist Theory Workshop Keynote "The Brown Commons" (video) https://www.youtube.com/watch?v=huGN866GnZE
 2012 Dr. Vaginal Davis in conversation with José Esteban Muñoz at NYU
 2002 Diana Taylor's interview of José Esteban Muñoz on performance studies
 Interview of José Esteban Muñoz (Real Audio).

1967 births
2013 deaths
American non-fiction writers
Duke University alumni
Latin Americanists
LGBT Hispanic and Latino American people
Cuban LGBT writers
Queer theorists
New York University faculty
American LGBT writers
Cuban non-fiction writers
Cuban male writers
LGBT academics
Male non-fiction writers